Nancy C. M. Hartsock (1943–2015) was a professor of Political Science and Women Studies (now Gender, Women, and Sexuality Studies) at the University of Washington from 1984 to 2009.

Personal life and education 
Hartsock was born in 1943 in a Methodist lower-middle class family, in Ogden, Utah. She attended Wellesley College. While there, Hartsock was involved in the Wellesley Civil Rights Group. This group provided tutoring in Roxbury and Boston, Massachusetts, as well as working with the Boston NAACP.

After finishing college, Hartsock went to get her Masters Degree from the University of Chicago. There, she got involved with a community organization group called The Woodlawn Organization, which was started by activist Saul Alinsky.

When Martin Luther King brought the Civil Rights movements north, Hartsock marched to help this movement. After this march, she then helped start a graduate student woman's caucus in Political Science.

Hartsock received her Ph.D. in Political Science from the University of Chicago in 1972. She was a practiced musician and prior to her dissertation, Hartsock built and played the harpsichord. Hartsock also expressed interest in equestrianism, food, travel and art.

Career 
Hartsock was a feminist philosopher. She was known for her work in feminist epistemology and standpoint theory, especially the 1983 essay "The Feminist Standpoint", which also integrated Melanie Klein's theories on psychoanalysis and the Oedipal crisis.  Her standpoint theory derived from Marxism, which claims that the proletariat has a distinctive perspective on social relations and that only this perspective reveals the truth. She drew an analogy between the industrial labor of the proletariat and the domestic labor of women to show that women can also have a distinctive standpoint.

The Feminist Standpoint Revisited and Other Essays was then published in 1998.

Hartsock was the first woman to be hired by the University of Michigan, where she taught in the Political Science Department. After a 3 year period, she moved to Washington DC and took a course at IPS on feminist theory in 1973. She then took part in the Quest staff and was in the subscription department where she did writing and editing. Quest lasted for almost 10 years.

Once she left Quest, she taught Political Science at Johns Hopkins. There she also helped take part in the effort to bring Woman's Studies to the University. Several years after, she moved to the University of Washington and learned that the Woman's Studies at Johns Hopkins was now a course.

Later, she focused her attention on woman's labor. Specifically, in the political economic dynamics of globalization. Hartsock then retired in 2009.

She served as President of the Western Political Science Association (1994–95), and was the Co-founder of the Center for Women & Democracy in Seattle, WA, Founding Director (1999-2000).

Death and legacy 
In 1985, Hartsock was diagnosed with late-stage breast cancer and lived for 30 more years. Hartsock died on March 19, 2015 in Seattle, Washington.

Prior to her retirement in 2009 Hartsock established the Nancy C.M. Hartsock Prize for Best Graduate Paper in Feminist Theory. Students from any college, and from any department can apply.

Awards
 Mentor of Distinction Award from the American Political Science Association Women's Caucus (1993, won)

Selected bibliography

Books

Chapters in books 
 Hartsock, Nancy (February 28, 1983), Discovering Reality. "The feminist standpoint: developing the ground for a specifically feminist historical materialism", in Harding, Sandra.pp. 283–310
 
  Available online.
Sisterhood is Powerful. Short entry explaining the remarks that professors made about the Woman's Caucus in 1970

Journal articles 
 
Also available as:
 
Also available as:
 
See also:

References

Further reading 
 
Internet Encyclopedia of Philosophy (2004). Nancy Hartsock, Allison Jagger, Hilary Rose, Sandra Harding. "Feminist Standpoint Theory" 
Stanford Encyclopedia of Philosophy First published Wednesday Oct 19, 2005; substantive revision Thursday Jul 7, 2016. "Feminist Perspectives on Power"

External links 
 Nancy C.M. Hartsock Papers - Pembroke Center Archives, Brown University

1943 births
2015 deaths
20th-century American philosophers
Philosophers from Washington (state)
American women philosophers
Epistemologists
Feminist philosophers
Feminist studies scholars
Marxist feminists
Postmodern feminists
American socialist feminists
University of Washington faculty